Remigiusz Olszewski (born 20 September 1992) is a Polish athlete competing in sprinting events. He represented his country in the 60 metres at the 2014, 2016 and 2018 World Indoor Championships reaching the semifinals on all three occasions.

Competition record

Personal bests
Outdoor
100 metres – 10.21 (+1.8 m/s, Bydgoszcz 2016)
200 metres – 20.89 (-0.4 m/s, Kutno 2015)
Indoor
60 metres – 6.62 (Toruń 2016)

References

PZLA profile

1992 births
Living people
Polish male sprinters
People from Piła County
Sportspeople from Greater Poland Voivodeship
Zawisza Bydgoszcz athletes
21st-century Polish people